Plaskett may refer to:

Places
 Plaskett, California
 Plaskett (crater), a lunar impact crater
 2905 Plaskett, an asteroid

People with the surname
 Elmo Plaskett (1938–1998), Major League Baseball player
 Freddie Plaskett (1926–2018), British soldier and chief executive
 Harry Hemley Plaskett (1893–1980), Canadian astronomer
 James Plaskett (born 1960), British chess player
 Joel Plaskett (born 1974), Canadian rock musician
 John Stanley Plaskett (1865–1941), Canadian astronomer
 Joseph Plaskett (1918–2014), Canadian painter
 Stacey Plaskett (born 1966), American politician and delegate to the US House Of Representatives from the US Virgin Islands

See also
 Plaskett's star
 Plaskitt, a surname